Hohenbergia conquistensis is a plant species in the genus Hohenbergia. This species is native to Brazil.

References

conquistensis
Flora of Brazil